Hemicryllis is a monotypic beetle genus in the family Cerambycidae described by Per Olof Christopher Aurivillius in 1922. Its only species, Hemicryllis alboguttata, was described by the same author in the same year.

References

Saperdini
Beetles described in 1922
Monotypic beetle genera